Sebastián Decoud and Eduardo Schwank were the defending champions, but Schwank decided not to participate.
Decoud partnered with Diego Junqueira, but withdrew before their first round match due to Decoud's back injury.
Juan Sebastián Cabal and Robert Farah defeated 1st seeds Franco Ferreiro and André Sá 6–3, 7–5 in the final.

Seeds

  Franco Ferreiro /  André Sá (final)
  Rui Machado /  Daniel Muñoz-de la Nava (first round)
  Brian Dabul /  Rogério Dutra da Silva (quarterfinals)
  Marcos Daniel /  Santiago González (first round)

Draw

Draw

External links
 Main Draw

Seguros Bolivar Open Medellin - Doubles
2010 Doubles